Daniel, Dan, or Danny Parker may refer to:
Daniel Parker (instrument maker) (ca. 1700-1730), English violin maker
Daniel Parker (silversmith) (1726-1785), American silversmith
Daniel Parker (Baptist) (1781–1844), leader in the Primitive Baptist Church in the Southern United States
Daniel Pinckney Parker (1781–1850), merchant, shipbuilder and businessman in Boston, Massachusetts
Daniel Parker (general) (1782–1846), officer in the United States Army
Daniel McNeill Parker (1822–1907), Canadian physician and politician
Daniel Parker (priest) (died 1945), Archdeacon of Winnipeg
Daniel Parker (artist) (born 1959), American wildlife sculptor and painter
Daniel Parker (footballer) (born 1974), Australian rules footballer
Danny Parker (songwriter) (born 1988), American songwriter
Dan Parker, chairman of the Indiana Democratic Party
Dan Parker, member of the band A Change of Pace
Daniel Parker (make-up artist), see Academy Award for Best Makeup and Hairstyling